Hildegard Neuffer-Stavenhagen (née Stavenagen 3 July 1866 in Greiz – 17 October 1939 in Weimar aged 73) was a German writer with a focus on children's literature and education.

Stavenhagen was born as the daughter of a merchant. She received piano lessons early on, her brother was the composer and pianist Bernhard Stavenhagen (1862–1914). Hildegard Neuffer-Stavenhagen was married with the Hungarian-born actor and theatre director Dagobert Neuffer (1851-1939) and mother of four children. Her son-in-law was the violinist Max Strub.

Work 
 Märchenfäden. With illustrations by Oskar Herrfurth. 5th mixed edition, M. R. Hoffmann, Berlin 1919 (6th edition 1921).
 Kinderseelen. Aus dem Tagebuche einer Mutter. M. R. Hoffmann, Berlin 1919.
 Schneewittchen und die sieben Zwerge. Märchenspiel in 10 Bildern. Music by Helmut Fellmer, Waisenhaus-Buchdruck, Braunschweig 1920.
 "Neuffers Tierleben". Wie meine Kinder mit Tieren Freundschaft hielten. With book decoration by Adalbert Stieren and 8 switched on reality pictures, Max R. Hoffmann, Berlin 1921.
 Durchsonnte Pflichten, eine Überwindung des Alltags. M. R. Hoffmann, Berlin 1925.
 Krippenspiel in drei Bildern. Textb. Vieweg, Berlin 1932.
 Die Mutterschaft, unsere Unsterblichkeit. Böhlau, Weimar 1935.

Literature 
 Elisabeth Friedrichs: Die deutschsprachigen Schriftstellerinnen des 18  und 19  Jahrhunderts. Ein Lexikon (Repertorien zur deutschen Literaturgeschichte. Vol. 9). Metzler, Stuttgart 1981, .
 Elgin Strub: Meine Großeltern, Hildegard Neuffer-Stavenhagen, Schriftstellerin und Dagobert Neuffer, großherzoglicher Schauspieler in Weimar. In Skizzen einer Künstlerfamilie in Weimar. J. E. Ronayne, London 1999, .
 Fritz Karl Voß: Weimarer Schattengeister. Scherenschnitte und Originalhandschriften aus dem literarischen Weimar von heute. A. Duncker, Weimar 1922.

References

External links 
 
 Hildegard Neuffer-Stavenhagen beim Thüringer Literaturrat

German women writers
Children's literature criticism
1866 births
1939 deaths
People from Greiz